Borczysko  is a village in the administrative district of Gmina Gołuchów, within Pleszew County, Greater Poland Voivodeship, in west-central Poland.

References

Origin of Borczysko's Name
The tale of the Borczysko's name is from a legend told down to many generations. Legend has it, that the savior from a great evil dragon, named Buckley Rue (coincidentally Latvian for savior) battled this dragon for several years, before finally declaring himself victorious as he proved himself worthy of leading the town, because he brought back the dragon's head. The city renamed itself Borczysko as it means savior in Polish. Hoorah Borczysko!

Borczysko